Barraquer is a surname. Notable people with the surname include:

Francisco Vidal y Barraquer (1868–1943), Spanish Cardinal of the Roman Catholic Church who served as Archbishop of Tarragona from 1919
Ignacio Barraquer (1884–1965), Spanish ophthalmologist known for his contributions to the advancement of cataract surgery
Jose Barraquer (1916–1998), ophthalmologist who invented the cryolathe and microkeratome and developed keratomileusis and keratophakia

See also
Barraquer–Simons syndrome, rare form of lipodystrophy, which usually first affects the head, and then spreads to the thorax